Diwata-2 or Diwata-2B is a Philippine microsatellite launched on October 29, 2018. It is the first satellite launched under the STAMINA4Space program.

Development
The satellite was developed by 11 scholars under the Philippine Department of Science and Technology (DOST), in cooperation with the Tohoku University and Hokkaido University in contrast to 9 DOST scholars who worked with Diwata-1, Diwata-2's predecessor.

Unlike its predecessor, Diwata-2 takes advantage of radio communication technology by carrying an amateur radio payload for disaster relief purposes. The satellite also hosts all embedded features of its predecessor.

The planning phase of the Diwata-2's development includes a simulation model, a mechanical test model, an engineering model and a flight model. This stage ended with the flight model which was completed on August 29, 2018, and was handed over to the Japan Aerospace Exploration Agency (JAXA) on the following day.

Instruments
Weighing , Diwata-2 hosts an amateur radio payload which will enable people in the Philippines to relay messages through ham radio to any part of the country. This function is meant for disaster relief operations. The satellite will also carry Spaceborne Multispectral Imager (SMI) with liquid crystal tunable filter (LCTF) for environmental monitoring, and a high precision telescope (HPT) for rapid post-disaster assessment. Compared to Diwata-1 which hosted wide and middle field cameras, Diwata-2 will host enhanced resolution cameras. The SMI, is equipped with an upgraded enhanced spatial resolution camera allowing the satellite to produce sharper images than the Diwata-1. It will also have deployable solar panels to power the satellite's payloads.

Launch and mission
The satellite was targeted by the DOST to be deployed as early as the second quarter of 2018. The projected launch date was later adjusted at least twice; June 2018 and later pushed forward to fourth quarter of 2018.

It was announced that on October 26, 2018, the satellite would be launched to space via the H-IIA from Japan at the Tanegashima Space Center at around 13:08 and 13:20 (JST). Unlike Diwata-1, Diwata-2 will be directly deployed from the rocket that will carry it from space and not from the International Space Station like its predecessor.

On October 29, 2018, the satellite was launched directly into orbit at 13:51 (UTC+9). Communication between the satellite and the DOST-ASTI's ground station in Quezon City was first established on October 29 at 21:52 (UTC+8).

Diwata-2 will have the same mission as its predecessor, Diwata-1. It will also have a fixed visit interval time unlike its predecessor, meaning it will hover above the same position on Earth for every 16 days. The satellite has a projected life expectancy of five years.

Diwata-2 carries an amateur radio payload and was designated as PO-101 by AMSAT. It is designated with the amateur call sign DW4TA by the National Telecommunications Commission of the Philippines.

See also
Agila-2
Space program of the Philippines

References

Earth imaging satellites
Satellites of the Philippines
2018 in the Philippines
Spacecraft launched in 2018
Spacecraft launched by H-II rockets
Amateur radio satellites
STAMINA4Space program